Ervis Koçi may refer to:
 Ervis Koçi (footballer, born 1984)
 Ervis Koçi (footballer, born 1998)